"Dur dur d'être bébé !", which was retitled "Dur dur d'être bébé! (It's Hard to Be a Baby)" for its American audience, is a 1992 song recorded by French singer Jordy Lemoine, credited as Jordy. The first single from his debut album, Pochette Surprise (1992), it was released in September 1992 and achieved success across the world, particularly in France. The single reached number one in Belgium, France, Hong Kong, Italy, Greece and Spain.

Background
After having tried to involve Jordy in TV advertisements for nappies where the baby should repeat "hard, hard to be wet", Claude Lemoine, Jordy's father, had the idea of using dance music and simple lyrics to create a catchy song. The result was well received in discothèques, which convinced Lemoine to release it as a commercial single.

Charts performance and records
Because of this song, Jordy was listed in the Guinness Book of World Records as the youngest singer ever to reach number one on a singles chart.  He achieved this feat in France in October 1992 at the age of four and a half, beating the previous world record held by Osamu Minagawa and French record held by Elsa Lunghini. Jordy was also the youngest artist to chart on the Billboard Hot 100, reaching number 58 with the song.

"Dur dur d'être bébé !" entered the French chart at number four on 26 September 1992, rose to number two for two weeks, and then topped the chart for 15 weeks, which was the record at the time.  The previous record for the longest stretch atop the French chart had belonged to Images' "Les Démons de minuit" (1986) and Licence IV's "Viens boire un p'tit coup à la maison" (1987), at 13 weeks apiece. Following its stay atop the chart, Jordy's single held the number two slot for another four weeks, eventually totalling 26 weeks in the French top ten and 30 weeks in the top 50. "Dur dur d'être bébé!" was also a dance hit across Europe, Latin America, Hong Kong and Japan. An English-language version and a mix version were also recorded and are available on the album Pochette Surprise.

Critical reception
Larry Flick from Billboard wrote, "Here's an artist who can make the members of Kris Kross look like old fogies." He added, "Five-year-old rapper/singer from France has topped the charts in almost every country in the free world (and a few that aren't). The concept is simple: Jordy chirps and rhymes in French about the rigors of childhood over a bouncy pop/dance beat. Top 40 pundits who regularly indulge in wacky novelty items will be salivating after the first chorus." Troy J. Augusto from Cashbox said, "Jordy, the hardest-working kindergartener in show biz. A novelty to be sure, his American intro is catchy enough that he may actually score a chart-topper here, too." British magazine Music Week commented, "Jordy is an impossibly cute French kid, aged four, whose vocal efforts have earned him a number one hit at home and abroad." They viewed the song as "a serviceable house track".

Cover versions
In 1993, the song was adapted into Portuguese by Ana Faria to be performed by children/teenpop group Onda Choc, known thus as "Que Vida A De Um Bebé!" It's featured on their thirteenth album Viva o Verão!

In 2010, the song was covered by Bébé Lilly and released as single in France, where it hit number 15 for two weeks on the singles chart.

Track listings

 7" single
 "Dur dur d'être bébé !" (single mix) — 3:23
 "Dur dur d'être bébé !" (techno mix) — 4:07

 12" maxi
 "Dur dur d'être bébé !" (single mix) — 3:23
 "Dur dur d'être bébé !" (techno mix) — 4:07

 CD single
 "Dur dur d'être bébé !" (single mix) — 3:23
 "Dur dur d'être bébé !" (techno mix) — 4:07

 CD maxi
 "Dur dur d'être bébé !" (single mix) — 3:24
 "Dur dur d'être bébé !" (club mix) — 5:21
 "Dur dur d'être bébé !" (dob mix) — 5:21
 "Dur dur d'être bébé !" (techno mix) — 4:07

 Cassette
 "Dur dur d'être bébé !" (single mix) — 3:23
 "Dur dur d'être bébé !" (techno mix) — 4:07

Charts and sales

Weekly charts

Year-end charts

Certifications

See also
List of number-one singles of 1992 (France)
List of number-one singles of 1993 (France)

References

1992 debut singles
Jordy (singer) songs
Number-one singles in Belgium
Number-one singles in Greece
Number-one singles in Italy
Number-one singles in Spain
SNEP Top Singles number-one singles
1992 songs
Columbia Records singles
Songs about childhood